The 2003–04 Turkish Basketball League was the 38th season of the top-tier professional basketball league in Turkey. The season started on October 10, 2003. Efes Pilsen won their eleventh national championship this season.

Regular season

League table

Oyak Renault and Tofaş have been relegated from the Turkish Basketball First League.  Banvit and Erdemirspor won promotion from the second league and played the 2004–05 season in the Turkish Basketball First League.

Turkish Basketball League 2003–04 play-offs

as of June 30, 2004

The 2004 Turkish Basketball League play-offs is the final phase of the 2003–04 regular season.

First round, Quarterfinal and Semifinal series are 5-match series. The teams reaches the first 3 wins is through to the next round.  The team which has won both regular season match-ups starts with a 1–0 lead to the series. If teams split up the regular season meetings, series starts with a 1–1 draw.

Final series are 7-match series and the team reaches first 4 wins is the champion of the Turkish Basketball League.

External links
 Turkish Basketball League Official Website
 Turkish Basketball Federation Official Website
 TBLStat.net League History, 2003-04 Season 

Turkish Basketball Super League seasons
Turkish
1